Robert Cronbach  (1908 – 2001)  American sculptor and teacher, born in St. Louis, Missouri where he began his art studies.  He is best remembered for his medals, architectural sculpture and other works.  His art studies continued at the Pennsylvania Academy of Fine Art where he won two Cresson Traveling Scholarships and travelled to Europe in 1929 and 1930.

During 1930 he worked as an assistant to Paul Manship.

In 1938 he was one of the 57 Founding Members of the Sculptors Guild.  He also created sculpture under the auspices of the Works Progress Administration's Federal Art Project.

Cronbach taught sculpture at Adelphi College in Garden City, New York from 1947 to 1961.

He was one of 250 sculptors who exhibited in the 3rd Sculpture International held at the Philadelphia Museum of Art in the summer of 1949. Cronbach was represented by the Bertha Schaefer Gallery, New York, NY.  Cronbach died in 2001 in San Miguel de Allende, Mexico.

Selected works
Exploitation, Los Angeles County Museum of Art, Los Angeles, California, 1935
Sculpture murals for Willert Park Courts, Buffalo, New York, with Harold Ambellan, a WPA project.
 Under the El University of Minnesota, Frederick R. Weisman Art Museum, Minneapolis, Minnesota  c. 1939
 Untitled, Springfield Art Museum, Springfield, Missouri, 1959
Prometheus, Smithsonian American Art Museum, Washington D.C. 1970
Eye of Fashion, Fashion Institute of Technology, New York, New York  1976
Deep Center,  Wichita State University, Edwin A. Ulrich Museum of Art, Wichita, Kansas
Rooftree,   Reynolds Aluminum Headquarters, Richmond, Virginia

References

1908 births
2001 deaths
20th-century American sculptors
American male sculptors
Federal Art Project artists
Sculptors Guild members
Artists from St. Louis
20th-century American male artists